So Long Mr. Chumps is a 1941 short subject directed by Jules White starring American slapstick comedy team The Three Stooges (Moe Howard, Larry Fine and Curly Howard). It is the 53rd entry in the series released by Columbia Pictures starring the comedians, who released 190 shorts for the studio between 1934 and 1959 (albeit with three different men: Curly Howard, his brother Shemp Howard, Joe Besser, and Curly Joe DeRita playing the "third Stooge" during different time frames).

Plot
The Stooges are inept but honest street cleaners. When they come across an envelope filled with oil bonds in the trash, they return them to their owner, B.O. Davis (John Tyrrell). The grateful Davis offers them a five thousand dollar reward if they can find an honest man with executive abilities. An honest dog ultimately leads them to a weeping girl (Dorothy Appleby), who explains that her sweetheart has been unfairly jailed. The best way to talk to him, the Stooges figure, is to get arrested themselves. They land in the clink and track down their man, Percy Pomeroy (Eddie Laughton). With some black paint, they make their prison outfits look like guard uniforms and make their escape. Just as they are leaving, Davis is coming in — handcuffed to a detective and revealed as "Lone Wolf" Louie, the biggest bond swindler in America." He, along with the Stooges, wind up back in jail. The stooges return to the rock pile where Moe and Larry break rocks over Curly's head.

Cast

Credited

Production notes
So Long Mr. Chumps was filmed on July 25–30, 1940. The film title is a parody of the film Goodbye, Mr. Chips. The jail sequences were reused in Beer Barrel Polecats.

When the Stooges drop their iron balls that are chained to their legs, the sounds that are heard are again the NBC Chimes, a gag recycled from the team's 1937 short Back to the Woods.

Bud Jamison appeared in a deleted scene where he was a policeman noticing the Stooges and Pomeroy's girlfriend.

In the final scene, where Moe and Larry were breaking rocks over Curly's head, Larry picks up what seems to be a rather heavy rock. Curly notices the rock and replies, "Hey, wait a minute! That's a real one! I'm no fool." Curly then chuckles, while Larry and Moe smile. Often regarded as an unscripted moment, it was later determined that exchange was scripted in advance, as it appeared in director Jules White's final shooting script.

Bruce Bennett (aka Herman Brix, a former Olympic athlete and Tarzan actor) appears in dual roles as both a truck driver and as one of the guards giving orders to the Stooges.

Laurel and Hardy had painted their prison uniforms white in 1927's The Second Hundred Years. They were also trash collectors in 1939's A Chump at Oxford.

References

External links 
 
 
So Long Mr. Chumps at threestooges.net

1941 films
The Three Stooges films
American black-and-white films
Films directed by Jules White
Columbia Pictures short films
American slapstick comedy films
1941 comedy films
1940s English-language films
1940s American films